Amblyseius angulatus is a species of mite in the Phytoseiidae family. It was described by Karg in 1982

References

angulatus
Animals described in 1982